The Sachem Central School District is one of the largest school districts by population on Long Island and among all suburban school districts in New York, United States. Founded in 1955, the district now encompasses residents of the Census-Designated Places of Holbrook, Holtsville and Farmingville, as well as some parts of the Incorporated Village of Lake Grove and the CDPs of Lake Ronkonkoma, Ronkonkoma, Nesconset, Bohemia and Bayport. As of 2011, its district office is located in Lake Ronkonkoma at Samoset Middle School.

Enrollment
As of 2015, Sachem School District has nearly 15,000 students enrolled annually.

School colors
Sachem School District's colors are red, black and gold. Though each school uses the same fight song which starts out with "Here's to Red, Black, and Gold...", since the split in 2004, Sachem High School North has used black and gold while Sachem High School East uses red and gold as its principal colors. Both schools proudly kept the Sachem team name "Sachem Flaming Arrows".

Reconfiguration
As voted upon by district constituents in 1999, the district built two new schools and reconfigured its current schools at the start of the 2004-2005 school year. The elementary schools, which formerly housed grades Kindergarten through 6th, are now K-5. Seneca and Sagamore junior high schools (formerly grades 7 and 8) became middle schools (grades 6 through 8). The former Sachem High School South, the 9th and 10th-grade facility, was converted into Samoset Middle School. Sequoya was built as a fourth middle school for the purpose of reconfiguration. Sachem High School North, formerly home to all 11th and 12th-grade students in the district became a 9-12 facility for students in the western and northern portions of the district. Sachem East was built as a 9-12 facility for students in the southern and eastern portions of the district.  Sachem East is also the second largest suburban high school in New York state.

District Cuts
On September 16, 2015, the Sachem School District Board of Education voted to cut custodial staff, athletics, clubs, and other extracurricular activities in order to reallocate $2.5 million for Special Education services and worker compensation costs. The board declined to cut $345,000 in Kindergarten aides. Changes will affect over 14,000 students across the district.

Three months later, on December 17, Sachem School District announced, due to declining enrollment and a $1.3 million budget gap, that it would close down Sequoya Middle School as well as Tecumseh and Gatelot Elementary Schools.

Schools

Elementary schools 
Cayuga
Chippewa
Gatelot (Closed 2016)
Grundy
Hiawatha
Lynwood
Merrimac
Nokomis
Tamarac
Tecumseh (Closed 2016)
Wenonah
Waverly

Middle schools 
Sagamore Middle School
Samoset Middle School
Seneca Middle School
Sequoya Middle School (Closed 2016)

High schools 
Sachem High School East
Sachem High School North

Unbuilt 
In addition to the schools mentioned above, a number of schools were once proposed, but never built.

Board of Education 
As of the 2020-2021 school year, Sachem's school board consists of the following members:

Notable alumni 
Jumbo Elliott – professional football player
Douglas M. Smith - New York State Legislator
Jon Bellion – singer, songwriter
Marc Sebastian- fashion model, stylist, and activist
Vince Russo – professional wrestling writer
Ryan DeRobertis – (A.K.A. Skylar Spence) electronic musician
Jeff Ruland – professional basketball player
Neal Heaton – professional baseball player
Keith Kinkaid – professional ice hockey player
Maria Michta-Coffey – Olympic race walker
Dalton Crossan – professional football player
George F. Winters – Philanthropist, Administrative Director Association of Applied Paleontological Sciences
Karen Ferguson-Dayes – soccer player
Joe Scally – soccer player

References

External links
 Official Sachem School District Website

Education in Suffolk County, New York
Brookhaven, New York
Islip (town), New York
School districts in New York (state)
School districts established in 1955